Golubtsovo is a rural locality (a passing loop) in Logovskoy Selsoviet, Pervomaysky District, Altai Krai, Russia. The population was 37 as of 2013. There are 2 streets.

Geography 
Golubtsovo is located 51 km northeast of Novoaltaysk (the district's administrative centre) by road. Novokopylovo is the nearest rural locality.

References 

Rural localities in Pervomaysky District, Altai Krai